WindEurope is an association promoting the use of wind power in Europe. Based in Brussels it has over 600 members, which are active in over 50 countries, including manufacturers with a leading share of the world wind power market, component suppliers, research institutes, national wind and renewables associations, developers, contractors, electricity providers, finance companies, insurance companies, and consultants.

See also
Wind power in the European Union
Renewable energy in the European Union
List of renewable energy organizations
World Wind Energy Association (WWEA)
American Wind Energy Association

References

External links
 WindEurope Official Home Page
 EWEA Offshore 2015
 EWEA 2015
 Creating the Internal Energy Market in Europe EWEA report (10/2012)
 Energy and the EU budget 2014-2020

Wind power in the European Union
International renewable energy organizations
Wind energy organizations